Lidelva is a river in Sørkapp Land at Spitsbergen, Svalbard. It has a length of about 5.5 kilometers, flowing through the valley of Liddalen, and further across the plain of Breinesflya. The river is named after Norwegian botanist Johannes Lid.

References

Rivers of Spitsbergen